Concavibalcis is a genus of sea snails, marine gastropod mollusks in the family Eulimidae.

Species
This includes the following:
 Concavibalcis haterumaensis Takano, Tsuzuki & Kano, 2022
 Concavibalcis scalaris (Warén, 1980)

References

External links
 To World Register of Marine Species
 Takano, T.; Tsuzuki, S.; Kano, Y. (2022). Description of a second species of the eulimid genus Concavibalcis (Gastropoda: Vanikoroidea). Zootaxa. 5093(3): 397-400

Eulimidae